The 2020 Sunshine Coast Gympie Rugby League season was to be the 101st season rugby league football in the area that is now the Sunshine Coast, Queensland.

The start to the season was disrupted by the COVID-19 pandemic, which was formally declared a pandemic on 11 March 2020.

On 16 June it was reported that a number of clubs – including six Division 1 clubs – didn't nominate sides for the 2020 season by the June 15h deadline. The season was eventually cancelled.

References 

2020 in Australian rugby league
Sport in the Sunshine Coast, Queensland